Jewish LGBTQ organizations are organizations, communities, and support groups which focus on creating a more LGBTQ-inclusive environment within Judaism. They are dedicated to promoting acceptance, equality, and inclusiveness for individuals who identify as lesbian, gay, bisexual, transgender, and/or queer. 

These organizations provide a range of resources and support services, including community-building events, educational programs, advocacy initiatives, and counseling services. They serve as a safe space for Jewish LGBTQ individuals to connect with others who share similar experiences, to find support and guidance, and to build a sense of belonging within Judaism. They not only address a societal issue that affects individuals, but also contribute to the high moral purpose of Tikkun olam and creating a world that is more just and equitable for all.

Organizations 

 Eshel - Founded in June 2010 with a mission to build community and acceptance for LGBTQ Jews and their families in Orthodox communities, Eshel trains its members to act as advocates for LGBTQ Orthodox Jewish people and their families. Through community gatherings, it aids LGBTQ Orthodox Jews in fulfilling Jewish values regarding family, education, culture, and spirituality. It was founded in 2010.
 The Institute for Judaism and Sexual Orientation - The Institute for Judaism, Sexual Orientation & Gender Identity at Hebrew Union College-Jewish Institute of Religion (HUC-JIR) was founded in 2000 and is the only one of its kind in the Jewish world. Its goal is to educate HUC-JIR students on LGBTQ issues, to help them challenge and eradicate homophobia and heterosexism; and to learn resources to be able to transform the communities they encounter into ones that are welcoming and inclusive of LGBT Jews.
 JQ Youth - A nonprofit organization and support group for Orthodox and formerly Orthodox LGBT youth. The website has a number of personal stories, videos, and a comprehensive list of resources for young people, their parents, families, and allies.
Union of Reform Judaism - Reform Judaism has a long history of working for the full inclusion of LGBT people in Jewish life and for their civil rights. The Women of Reform Judaism called for the decriminalization of homosexuality as early as 1965, where resolutions later followed by the Union for Reform Judaism and the Central Conference of American Rabbis. Religious Action Center (RAC), the social justice division of the Reform Movement, has been at the forefront of the fight for LGBT equality. In addition to several congregations whose primary outreach is to the LGBT community, LGBT Jews and their families are welcomed in all of Reform temples today. LGBT Jews can be ordained as rabbi cantors, and they serve throughout the Reform movement. Also, most Reform rabbis and cantors will gladly officiate at same-sex ceremonies.
 Keshet - A grassroots organization which works to establish equality and inclusion of LGBT Jews in Jewish life. It is led and supported by LGBT Jews and straight allies. Keshet's goal is to cultivate the spirit and practice of inclusion in all parts of the Jewish community.
 The World Congress of Gay, Lesbian, Bisexual, and Transgender Jews: Keshet Ga’avah - Formed in 1975, Keshet Ga’avah consists of around 50 member organizations worldwide that work to ensure that LGBT Jews can live free and fulfilling lives. Organization has held conferences all over the world to meet the needs of their members locally, nationally, and internationally.
 SOJOURN - The Southern Jewish Resource Network for Gender & Sexual Diversity is the Southern America's resource for Jewish and LGBTQ+ programming, education, support, and advocacy. Its mission is to advance LGBTQ+ affirmation and empowerment across the South.
 SVARA - A Jewish text research academy devoted to the study of the Talmud. It is open to all individuals, including from other religious traditions, who wish to participate. SVARA specifically acknowledges the wisdom and contribution to the changing Jewish culture that LGBT Jews and their allies can bring.
GLYDSA: The Gay and Lesbian Yeshiva Day School Alumni Association - Established in 1995. Its mission is to build a community for LGBT Jews, from Orthodox or traditional backgrounds, and to integrate their Jewish and gay identities, in a self-affirming, confidential manner, through social events and other activities.
 Gay and Lesbian Orthodox Jews - A website for LGBT individuals who are members of the Jewish Orthodox community. The website features discussion of religious scriptures, as well as comments from Orthodox Rabbis about the intersection of Judaism and sexuality.

In Israel 

 A Wider Bridge - Seeks to inspire LGBT Jews to deepen their Jewish identity through connection with Israel and to develop stronger connections between the LGBT communities in Israel and North America.
 Bat-Kol - A religious lesbian organization founded in Israel to allow women fulfill both their religious and lesbian identities, and to make it possible for women to live in loving relationships, to raise children without deception, while staying committed to religion.
 Havruta - Offers social support networks for religious LGBT people in Israel. Beyond being a safe haven, Havruta actively works to inform and educate the religious public about LGBT issues in their communities.
 HOD - An organization for religious homosexual Jews, providing a platform for open-minded discussion in order to promote awareness of being gay and Orthodox.
 Jerusalem Open House - The Jerusalem Open House for Pride and Tolerance is a leading organization of LGBTQ people and their allies in Jerusalem. As a grassroot, activist community center, JOH provides services to all LGBTQ individuals in Jerusalem and surrounding communities, while working to secure LGBTQ rights in Israeli society at large.

In Europe 

 Beit Haverim - a French organization for LGBT Jews founded in 1977.
 Keshet Deutschland - founded in Berlin in 2018, to support visibility for Jewish members of the LGBTI community.

In United Kingdom 

 KeshetUK - UK member organization of Keshet. It was established with the mission of promoting the inclusion of Jewish LGBT+ individuals and their families within all aspects of Jewish life in the UK. The organization primarily focuses on education and training initiatives to achieve its goal.
 The Jewish LGBT+ Group (formerly JGLG)
 A social group for Gay Jews in London
 Laviot
 Pink Peacock, a queer Yiddish anarchist café in Glasgow
 Rainbow Jews - A history project showcasing the heritage of Jewish Lesbian, Gay, Bisexual and Transgender people in the UK from the 1950s to today.

Former organizations 

 Nehirim - Nehirim (2004-2015) was a community for GLBT Jews, partners, and allies, and was the largest national provider of programming for the GLBT Jewish community.

See also 

 LGBT-affirming denominations in Judaism
 LGBT clergy in Judaism
 Timeline of LGBT Jewish history
 Judaism and sexuality
 Same-sex marriage and Judaism
 Homosexuality and Judaism
 List of LGBT Jews
 LGBT rights in Israel

References 

Rights organizations
LGBT Jewish organizations
Judaism-related lists